The National Redemption Council (NRC) was the ruling Ghana military government from 13 January 1972 to 9 October 1975. Its chairman was Colonel I. K. Acheampong, who was thus also the head of state of Ghana.

Duration of rule
The NRC came into power through a bloodless coup d'état, led by Acheampong, which overthrew the democratically elected Progress Party (PP) government of Dr. K. A. Busia, taking place while Dr. Busia was in the United Kingdom for medical reasons. The constitution was suspended and all political parties banned. One of the main grievances leading to the coup had been the currency devaluations undertaken under the PP regime.

13 January 1972
Acheampong is reported to have been promoted to Colonel just two days prior to the coup to "secure his loyalty" for the Busia government. He was also the commander of the First Infantry Brigade at the time, (now Southern Command of the Ghana Army). He collaborated with three officers, Major Agbo, Major Baah and Major Selormey whose military units were vital for the bloodless coup. Agbo is quoted as stating that Acheampong was brought in at the latter stages to support the coup. Agbo was the second-in-command of the First Infantry Battalion at Tema, Selormey was the second-in-command of the armored regiment and Baah was the second-in-command of the Fifth Infantry Battalion in Accra. Acheampong stated in the nationwide broadcast to announce the coup that: I bring you good tidings; Busia's hypocrisy has been detected. We, in the Ghana Armed Forces, have today taken over the Government from Busia and his ruling Progress Party. With immediate effect, the Constitution is withdrawn, Parliament is dissolved, the Progress Party and all political parties are banned.

9 October 1975
On 9 October 1975, the NRC was replaced by the Supreme Military Council. Its composition consisted of Acheampong, the chairman, who was also promoted straight from Colonel to General. The others included the military hierarchy including all military service commanders such as Lt. Gen. Akuffo the Chief of Defence Staff, and the army, navy, air force and Border Guards commanders respectively. Some officers were promoted, some changed portfolios and many others were dropped. The Commanders of the First and Second Infantry Brigades of the Ghana Army were also included. It is thought that this coup removed Agbo, Baah and Selormey whom Acheampong had begun to see as a threat. It also made the various service commanders in charge of both the military and the state as there had been some tensions between relatively junior officers in government and the senior commanders of the Armed Forces.

Programmes
The NRC government embarked on various programmes to help improve the economy. One of its most successful was the 'Operation Feed Yourself' programme which encouraged self-reliance on home-grown food by encouraging both large scale and small scale farming. This started well but is ultimately seen as a failure in the end. It was during this era that the National Pledge was also introduced. This was to be recited on national occasions. The government also revalued the national currency which had been devalued by the Busia government by 42 per cent. It also repudiated some of the national debt in February 1972. On 4 August 1974, the 'Operation Keep Right' was implemented which changed Ghana's road traffic from driving on the left as introduced by the United Kingdom to driving on the right in harmony with its neighbouring West African states where traffic circulation was on the right. This was supervised by Akuffo who was the Border Guards commander at the time. The NRC government also implemented the official conversion of units of measurement in the country to the metric system on 1 September 1975.

Foiled coup attempts
There were several attempts to overthrow the NRC government. None of them resulted in bloodshed. In November 1972, 8 people were found guilty by a military tribunal for plotting to overthrow the government. They were Staff Sergeant S. J. Opon-Nyantekyi, Daniel D. O. Attakora, Emil W. K. Adzima who was the former press secretary to Kofi Busia, George K. A. Ofosu-Amaah, who was a senior lecturer in law at the University of Ghana and Director of the Special Branch (national intelligence unit) in the Busia regime, Private C. Adu Boateng, Sergeant W. Agyare, Private K. Oduro and Sergeant G. Nimako.

In August 1973, Kojo Botsio, a minister in the Nkrumah CPP government together with others was arrested for planning to overthrow the government.

In December 1973, three out of five accused persons were found guilty of subversion by a military tribunal. The guilty were Imoru Ayarna, former leader of the disbanded People's Action Party, Kojo Botsio and John Tettegah. Albert Kwaku Owusu-Boateng was jailed for 30 years for concealing the plot while Air Force Major Alexander A. Awuviri was acquitted and discharged.

In 1976, a coup plot referred to as the "One Man One Matchet" coup was foiled. The plotters included Brigadier Khattah, the leader, who escaped arrest and the others were Kojo Tsikata, a retired Ghana Army captain, Victor Latzoo, a retired lieutenant in the Ghana Army, Staff Sergeant Godfried K. Amereka, Warrant Officer H. Raphael Nyatepeh, Captain Gustav K. Banini, Corporal John Gbeeze, Francis Agboada and Michael Hamenoo. Tsikata, Staff Sergeant Godfried Amereka, Warrant Officer Raphael Nyatepeh, Francis Agboada and Michael Hamenoo were sentenced to death. Two others were sentenced to eighteen years in jail.

Members of the NRC
The NRC was made up of Acheampong, the various service commanders of the Ghana Armed Forces, the Inspector General of Police, four other army officers of the rank of Major and a civilian who was the Attorney General and Commissioner for Justice.

Some programmes of the NRC
The NRC introduced the Ghana National Pledge.
Operation Feed Yourself - an Agricultural campaign for national self-sufficiency in food supplies.
Operation Keep Right - The changeover from driving on the left to the right which occurred on August 4, 1974.

Notes

Sources and external links
Members of NRC on WorldStatesMan.org
The National Redemption Council(NRC) Charter

Military of Ghana
Military coups in Ghana
Politics of Ghana
Government of Ghana
1975 in Ghana
1972 establishments in Ghana
1975 disestablishments
1970s coups d'état and coup attempts
Military dictatorships